The Maisy Battery is a group of World War II artillery batteries constructed in secret by the German Wehrmacht near the French village of Grandcamp-Maisy in Normandy. 

It formed a part of Germany's Atlantic Wall coastal fortifications and was the principal position of defence for that area.  It was responsible for the defence of the sector between the Longues-sur-Mer and the St Marcouf (Crisbecq) batteries.  It could target the sectors around both Omaha Beach and Utah Beach, two of the five landing sites for the Allied invasion of Normandy in June 1944.

Pre-invasion planning
Anticipating an Allied invasion of Nazi-occupied Europe from the United Kingdom during World War II, the Germans built an extensive system of defenses. The Maisy Battery was built in particular secrecy, under strict security, using forced labour brought in from the Soviet Union, Czechoslovakia and Poland. This avoided any local involvement that might reveal the existence of the site to the French Resistance and, through them, to the Allies.

By the time of preparations for D-Day, the Wehrmacht-run battery was marked on the Allied D-Day maps as a Rangers D-Day target - confirmed in records found in the early 21st century. Prior to D-Day, the Nazis had drawn significant attention to the gun battery at nearby Pointe du Hoc, a cliff top site overlooking the beaches, as compared to the slightly inland site of the Maisy battery. By the time of the invasion, Pointe du Hoc was manned by a token force of Wehrmacht troops, and the artillery pieces had been moved to other sites, replaced by dummy guns.

The Maisy site actually consisted of three batteries, Les Perruques, La Martiniere and Foucher Farm, labeled as Allied targets 5, 16 and 16A respectively. The battery at Les Perrugues, which was designated by the Germans as WN83, Widerstandsnest 83 (Resistance Nest 83), included six 155 mm First World War French field howitzers.  The battery at La Martiniere, designated WN84, included four 105 mm pieces.  Four 150 mm pieces were located at Foucher Farm.

Normandy landings
The battery was garrisoned by elements of the 352nd and 716th Infantry and Artillery Divisions, plus Flak Regiment No. 1 consisting of twelve 88-mm anti-aircraft artillery pieces sent to protect the battery shortly before D-Day on 5 June 1944.

The other two sites remained operational until they were assaulted by the US 2nd Rangers and the US 5th Rangers on 9 June.

The batteries at Maisy were D-Day mission objective Number 6 as given to Colonel James Rudder in his Operation Neptune intelligence and US 1st Infantry Division orders. However, he did not brief his men to carry out the mission to Maisy. Historian Gary Sterne, in a book published in 2014, suggests that Rudder disobeyed orders calling on him to continue to Maisy after taking Pointe du Hoc. The Rangers stayed at Pointe du Hoc for some days until relieved, which kept them from completing their D-day orders and away from the Maisy site - as well as  the D-day Phase Line which was their main target for the evening of 6 June. This allowed the guns at Maisy to continue to shell troops in both the Omaha Beach and Utah Beach sectors for three days after the landings. Rudder always claimed that his orders called on him to hold the highway against a possible counterattack against Pointe du Hoc, but Sterne and subsequent historians could not find any such order in the US National Archives.

Rediscovery
British military historian Gary Sterne rediscovered Maisy Battery in January 2004, based on a hand-drawn map in the pocket of a US Army veteran's uniform he had bought.

Prior to D-Day, the battery had been recorded as the second highest D-Day target in the Omaha Sector group of fortifications, but the exact location had been lost from later records. Using the old map, Sterne was able to locate a bunker entrance amongst the undergrowth.  Sterne then investigated further and found additional fortified buildings, gun platforms, and a hospital. Over 3 kilometres of trenches were uncovered.

In June 2006, the site was opened for the first time to visitors, with the battery site at Les Perruques an ongoing tourist attraction.

References

External links
Maisy Battery Official Site
Guide to visiting Maisy Battery

Operation Overlord
Atlantic Wall
Buildings and structures in Calvados (department)
Military history of France during World War II
Military history of Normandy
Fortifications in France
World War II sites in France
Tourist attractions in Calvados (department)